Electric Eden: Unearthing Britain's Visionary Music is a 2011 book by Rob Young about the history of British folk music in the 1960s and 1970s. It is published by Faber & Faber.

Notes

References 

 
   
 
 
 
 
 
 
 
 
 
 
 
 
 
 

2011 non-fiction books
British music history
Books on English music
Faber and Faber books
Books of music criticism
British folk music